Gezeli-ye Sofla (also Romanized as Gezelī-ye Soflá; also known as Gezelī-ye Pā’īn) is a village in Abdoliyeh-ye Sharqi Rural District, in the Central District of Ramshir County, Khuzestan Province, Iran. At the 2006 census, its population was 57, in 11 families.

References 

Populated places in Ramshir County